{{DISPLAYTITLE:C12H18O4}}
The molecular formula C12H18O4 (molar mass: 226.27 g/mol, exact mass: 226.1205 u) may refer to:

 Allixin
 Dibutyl squarate
 1,6-Hexanediol diacrylate